Baczynski or Baczyński is a Polish surname. People with the surname include:

Krzysztof Kamil Baczyński (1921–1944), Polish poet killed during the Warsaw Uprising.
Seth Baczynski (born 1981), American mixed martial artist
Stanisław Baczyński (1890–1939), Polish writer and literary critic

See also
 Bachinsky, Ukrainian/Russian version